Puszczew  is a village in the administrative district of Gmina Wręczyca Wielka, within Kłobuck County, Silesian Voivodeship, in southern Poland.

The village has a population of 652. It was established by German settlers at the turn of the 19th century together with Węglowice.

References

Puszczew